Süderlügum (Mooring North Frisian: Läigem or Sööderläigem; Wiedingharde North Frisian: Leegem) is a municipality in the district of Nordfriesland, in Schleswig-Holstein, Germany. It is situated near the border with Denmark, approximately 35 km west of Flensburg, and 7 km southeast of Tønder.

Süderlügum is part of the amt (collective municipality) of Südtondern.

Transportation

Süderlügum lies on the Marsh Railway and offers connections to Niebüll and Tondern.

References

Nordfriesland